Sir Nicholas Byron (1416–1503) was an English nobleman, politician, and knight.

Family 
Byron was the son of John Byron, and his wife, Margery Booth. He was created a Knight of the Bath by Arthur, Prince of Wales on the occasion of Prince Arthur's marriage on 14 November 1501.

Marriage and issue 
Sir Nicholas married Joan Bushler, daughter of Sir John Bushler of Haugham, Lincolnshire and Elizabeth Berkeley, with whom he had five daughters and two sons, including John Byron. Joan survived her husband and married Sir Gervase Clifton of Clifton, Nottingham.

References 

1416 births
1503 deaths
15th-century English people
16th-century English people
Nicholas
English knights
Knights of the Bath